Qezlar (also Romanized as Qezel Lar; also known as Qarah Bāgh) is a village in Jeyransu Rural District, in the Central District of Maneh and Samalqan County, North Khorasan Province, Iran. At the 2006 census, its population was 502, in 108 families.

References 

Populated places in Maneh and Samalqan County